Kalasha is an Indo-Aryan language spoken by the Kalash people, in the Chitral District of Khyber Pakhtunkhwa province of Pakistan. There are an estimated 4,100 speakers of Kalasha. It is an endangered language and there is an ongoing language shift to Khowar.

Kalasha should not be confused with the nearby Nuristani language Waigali (Kalasha-ala). According to Badshah Munir Bukhari, a researcher on the Kalash, "Kalasha" is also the ethnic name for the Nuristani inhabitants of a region southwest of the Kalasha Valleys, in the Waygal and middle Pech Valleys of Afghanistan's Nuristan Province. The name "Kalasha" seems to have been adopted for the Kalash people by the Kalasha speakers of Chitral from the Nuristanis of Waygal, who for a time expanded up to southern Chitral several centuries ago. However, there is no close connection between the Indo-Aryan language Kalasha-mun (Kalasha) and the Nuristani language Kalasha-ala (Waigali), which descend from different branches of the Indo-Iranian languages.

History 

Early scholars to have done work on Kalasha include the 19th-century orientalist Gottlieb Wilhelm Leitner and the 20th-century linguist Georg Morgenstierne. More recently, studies have been undertaken by Elena Bashir and several others. The development of practical literacy materials has been associated with the Kalasha linguist Taj Khan Kalash.  The Southern Kalash or Urtsun Kalash shifted to a Khowar-influenced dialect of Kalasha-mun in the 20th century called Urtsuniwar.

Classification 
Of all the languages in Pakistan, Kalasha is likely the most conservative, along with the nearby language Khowar. In a few cases, Kalasha is even more conservative than Khowar, e.g. in retaining voiced aspirate consonants, which have disappeared from most other Dardic languages.

Some of the typical retentions of sounds and clusters (and meanings) are seen in the following list. However, note some common New Indo-Aryan and Dardic features as well.

Phonology
The Kalasha language is phonologically atypical because it contrasts plain, long, nasal and retroflex vowels as well as combinations of these (Heegård & Mørch 2004). Set out below is the phonology of Kalasha:

Vowels

Consonants
As with other Dardic languages, the phonemic status of the breathy voiced series is debatable. Some analyses are unsure of whether they are phonemic or allophonic—i.e., the regular pronunciations of clusters of voiced consonants with /h/.

The phonemes /x ɣ q/ are found in loanwords.

Vocabulary comparison
The following table compares Kalash words to their cognates in other Indo-Aryan languages.

Conservative traits

Examples of conservative features in Kalasha and Khowar are (note, NIA = New Indo-Aryan, MIA = Middle Indo-Aryan, OIA = Old Indo-Aryan):
 Preservation of intervocalic /m/ (reduced to a nasalized /w/ or /v/ in late MIA elsewhere), e.g. Kal. grom, Kho. gram "village" < OIA grāma
 Non-deletion of intervocalic /t/, preserved as /l/ or /w/ in Kalasha, /r/ in Khowar (deleted in middle MIA elsewhere), e.g. Kho. brār "brother" < OIA bhrātṛ; Kal. ʃau < *ʃal, Kho. ʃor "hundred" < OIA śata
 Preservation of the distinction between all three OIA sibilants (dental /s/, palatal /ś/, retroflex /ṣ/); in most of the subcontinent, these three had already merged before 200 BC (early MIA)
 Preservation of sibilant + consonant, stop + /r/ clusters (lost by early MIA in most other places):
 Kal. aṣṭ, Kho. oṣṭ "eight" < OIA aṣṭā; Kal. hast, Kho. host "hand" < OIA hasta; Kal. istam "bunch" < OIA stamba; Kho. istōr "pack horse" < OIA sthōra; Kho. isnār "bathed" < OIA snāta; Kal. Kho. iskow "peg" < OIA * (< skambha); Kho. iśper "white" < OIA śvēta; Kal. isprɛs, Kho. iśpreṣi "mother-in-law" < OIA śvaśru; Kal. piṣṭ "back" < OIA pṛṣṭha; Kho. aśrū "tear" < OIA aśru.
 Kho. kren- "buy" < OIA krīṇ-; Kal. grom, Kho. grom "village" < OIA grāma; Kal. gŕä "neck" < OIA grīva; Kho. griṣp "summer" < OIA grīṣma
 Preservation of /ts/ in Kalasha (reinterpreted as a single phoneme)
 Direct preservation of many OIA case endings as so-called "layer 1" case endings (as opposed to newer "layer 2" case endings, typically tacked onto a layer-1 oblique case):
 Nominative
 Oblique (Animate): Pl. Kal. -an, Kho. -an < OIA -ān
 Genitive: Kal. -as (sg.), -an (pl.); Kho. -o (sg.), -an, -ān (pl.) < OIA -asya (sg.), āṇām (pl.)
 Dative: Kal. -a, Kho. -a < OIA dative -āya, elsewhere lost already in late OIA
 Instrumental: Kal. -an, Kho. -en < OIA -ēna
 Ablative: Kal. -au, Kho. -ār < OIA -āt
 Locative: Kal. -ai, Kho. -i < OIA -ai
 Preservation of more than one verbal conjugation (e.g. Kho. mār-īm "I kill" vs. bri-um "I die")
 Preservation of OIA distinction between "primary" (non-past) and "secondary" (past) endings and of a past-tense "augment" in a-, both lost entirely elsewhere: Kal. pim "I drink", apis "I drank"; kārim "I do", akāris "I did"
 Preservation of a verbal preterite tense (see examples above), with normal nominative/accusative marking and normal verbal agreement, as opposed to the ergative-type past tenses with nominal-type agreement elsewhere in NIA (originally based on a participial passive construction)

Further reading

References

Bibliography

 Maps showing distribution of words among people of Kafiristan.

External links

 Richard Strand's Nuristan Site
 Reiko and Jun's Japanese Kalasha Page
 Hindi/Urdu-English-Kalasha-Khowar-Nuristani-Pashtu Comparative Word List
 Frontier Language Institute The Kalasha Dictionary
 Georg Morgenstierne multimedia database
 Frontier Language Institute Kalasha dictionary

Dardic languages
Kalash people
Languages of Chitral
Languages of Khyber Pakhtunkhwa